Polymorphus fatimaae is a species of Acanthocephala in the family Polymorphidae. It was first described in 2008. It can be found in Hyderabad, Sindh.

References

Animals described in 2008
Polymorphidae